The International Winter Sports Week (French: Semaine Internationale des Sports d'Hiver) were a winter multi-sport event (Nordic skiing and Ice skating) which was held from 1907 to 1929 in France.

Hosts 
1907. Briançon-Montgenèvre
1908. Chamonix-Mont-Blanc
1909. Morez
1910. Cauterets
1911. Le Lioran
1912. Chamonix-Mont-Blanc
1913. Gérardmer
1914. Briançon-Montgenèvre (cancelled)
1920. Chamonix-Mont-Blanc
1921. Chamonix-Mont-Blanc
1922. Morez
1923. Luchon-Superbagnères
1924. Briançon-Montgenèvre
1925. Le Revard (cancelled)
1926. Pontarlier
1927. Chamonix-Mont-Blanc
1928. Chamonix-Mont-Blanc (cancelled)
1929. Luchon-Superbagnères

See also
 Nordic Games

References

Defunct multi-sport events
Recurring sporting events established in 1907
Winter multi-sport events
Winter sports competitions in France
1907 establishments in France
1929 disestablishments in France